Arena Pantanal is a multi-use stadium in Cuiabá, Brazil. Completed on 26 April 2014, it is used mostly for football and hosted four group stage matches during the 2014 FIFA World Cup. During the World Cup, the arena had a capacity of 41,390, and currently can seat 44,003 spectators.

Prior to its use for the 2014 FIFA World Cup, the venue received much criticism. It suffered a fire in October 2013, due to polystyrene insulation panels catching alight. Although nobody was injured, the fire came within 24 hours of the state governor of Mato Grosso warning that it may not be finished for the World Cup.  On the day of its opening, on 24 April 2014, 5,000 seats were still to be installed in the stadium. Next to the football stadium is the Ginásio Aecim Tocantins.

2014 FIFA World Cup

2021 Copa América
Arena Pantanal was one of the five venues to host matches of the 2021 Copa América.

References

External links

 Official website
  Cuiabá avança com Arena Pantanal e quer receber Copa das Confederações (Cuiabá advances with the Arena Pantanal and wants to host the Confederations Cup), O Globo
  Cuiabá já no clima de preparativos para o Mundial 2014 (Cuiabá already in the mood to prepare for the 2014 World Cup)
 FIFA World Cup Profile

Football venues in Mato Grosso
Sports venues completed in 2014
2014 FIFA World Cup stadiums
Arena Pantanal
2014 establishments in Brazil
Cuiabá Esporte Clube
Mixto Esporte Clube